Józef Chlebowczyk (19 January 1924, in Karwina – 14 August 1985, in Sozopol) was a Polish historian.

Chlebowczyk was born in Karwina as a son of Augustyn Chlebowczyk, local administrative worker. He graduated from Juliusz Słowacki Polish Grammar School in Orłowa and later from the Main School of Planning and Statistics in Warsaw. In 1961 he gained a Ph.D. In 1966 he passed his habilitation. In 1977 Chlebowczyk gained the title of professor. Since 1968 he worked in Silesian Institute in Katowice and lectured at the Silesian University.

He focused on the history of Cieszyn Silesia and nationalist movements in Central Europe.

He was considered as an outstanding Polish historian.

Works 
 Główne problemy i etapy stosunków polsko-czeskich na Śląsku Cieszyńskim w XIX i na początku XX wieku (do r. 1914) (1961)
 Wybory do organów przedstawicielskich na Śląsku Cieszyńskim w 1848 r.: przyczynek do badań nad kształtowaniem się świadomości i aktywności społecznej w okresie kapitalizmu (1964)
 Wybory i świadomość społeczna na Śląsku Cieszyńskim w drugiej połowie XIX w. (1966)
 Nad Olzą (Śląsk Cieszyński w wiekach XVIII, XIX i XX) (1971)
 Karol Śliwka - i jego towarzysze walki (1972)
 Procesy narodotwórcze we wschodniej Europie Środkowej w dobie kapitalizmu (1975)
 Między dyktatem, realiami a prawem do samostanowienia: prawo do samookreślenia i problem granic we wschodniej Europie Środkowej w pierwszej wojnie światowej oraz po jej zakończeniu (1988)

Footnotes

References 
 
 Elektroniczny Słownik Biograficzny Śląska Cieszyńskiego

Further reading 
 Wanatowicz, Maria Wanda (ed.), Józef Chlebowczyk - badacz procesów narodowotwórczych w Europie XIX i XX wieku, Katowice 2007.

20th-century Polish historians
Polish male non-fiction writers
Polish people from Zaolzie
Writers from Karviná
1924 births
1985 deaths
Academic staff of the University of Silesia in Katowice